Richard S. Whitcomb (27 December 1894 – 12 July 1982) was a United States Army general who served in World War I, World War II, and the Korean War

Early life
Whitcomb was born in Kansas, on 27 December 1894.

Military career 
As a Major during World War II, Whitcomb served in Iceland (1941-1943) and was the commander of the U.S. Army's 11th Port Company in England and France (1943-1945). He was promoted to Brigadier General soon after World War II and served as the U.S. Army's port commander in Manila, Philippines during the mid-1940s.

During Korean War, he was appointed as a commander of 2nd logistics command of Busan in 1953.

Later life 
He left the United States Army in February 1955. he stayed in South Korea and dedicated the rest of his life to restoration project of postwar South Korea.

Legacy and honors 
In November 2022, He received Order of Civil Merit - Mugunghwa Medal from South Korean Government.

References

Externallinks
 역사 속 인물 이야기, 리처드 위컴 장군

1894 births
1982 deaths
United States Army generals
United States Army personnel of World War I
United States Army personnel of World War II
United States Army personnel of the Korean War